

DA - Algeria

DB - Benin

DF - Burkina Faso

DG - Ghana

DI - Côte d'Ivoire (Ivory Coast)

DN - Nigeria

DR - Niger

DT - Tunisia

DX - Togo

References
 
  - includes IATA codes
 Aviation Safety Network - IATA and ICAO airport codes

D
ICAO code
Airports
Airports
Airports
Airports
Airports
Airports
Airports
Airports
Airports